The Catalina 25 is an American trailerable sailboat, that was designed by Frank Butler and first built in 1978.

Production
The boat was built by Catalina Yachts in the United States, between 1978 and 1994. It is the most popular sailboat in this size range ever built in the US with 5866 examples completed.

Design

The Catalina 25 is a small recreational keelboat built predominantly of fiberglass with wood for structural support and trim. It has a masthead sloop rig, a transom-hung rudder, and a fixed fin keel, fixed winged keel, or swing keel.

There is also a tall rig version with a mast about  higher.

Internal accommodations have two layouts, one with a "traditional" double settee and fold-down table, and the other a "dinette" table arrangement. There is a forward "V" berth and a double berth under the cockpit. The galley is located on the port side just forward of the companionway ladder. The galley is equipped with a stove, ice box and a sink. The head is located just aft of the bow cabin and includes a sink.

The higher horsepower outboard is useful for motoring in a current or offshore. A few of the later models were offered with inboards.

Operational history
In a 2010 review Steve Henkel wrote, "best features: One of the best things about owning a popular boat like the Catalina 25 is the automatic chance to make new friends among the thousands of existing C25 owners. Among the reasons for the boat's phenomenal popularity was her low first cost, whether new or used. Worst feature: Construction quality over the years varied from poor to very good. Among mechanical problems, boats with swing keels tended to require more than average maintenance."

A 2016 review by Darrell Nicholson of Practical Sailor, concluded, "new or unseasoned sailors making their first or second foray into the boat-buying game may find that the Catalina 25 is an attractive choice. The boat is relatively easy to handle, can be single-handed without too much trouble, and while not fast in the racing sense, is fast enough to satisfy many cruisers."

See also
List of sailing boat types

Similar sailboats
Beachcomber 25
Bayfield 25
Beneteau First 25.7
Beneteau First 25S
Beneteau First 260 Spirit
Bombardier 7.6
C&C 25
C&C 25 Redline
Cal 25
Cal 2-25
Capri 25
Catalina 250
Com-Pac 25
Dufour 1800
Freedom 25
Hunter 25
Hunter 25.5
Kelt 7.6
Kirby 25
MacGregor 25
Merit 25
Mirage 25
Northern 25
O'Day 25
Sirius 26
Tanzer 25
Tanzer 7.5
US Yachts US 25
Watkins 25

References

External links

Keelboats
1970s sailboat type designs
Sailing yachts
Trailer sailers
Sailboat type designs by Frank Butler
Sailboat types built by Catalina Yachts